The Wetlands Institute is a non-profit organization started in 1969 by the executive director of WWF, Herbert Mills. The Wetlands Institute sits on 6,000 acres (24 km²) of protected wetlands in Stone Harbor, New Jersey. It hosts educational tours and courses and is a base for research on wetlands ecology.

It is home to the annual Wings 'n Water art festival.

References

Nature centers in New Jersey
Buildings and structures in Cape May County, New Jersey
Tourist attractions in Cape May County, New Jersey
Protected areas of Cape May County, New Jersey
Stone Harbor, New Jersey